DF or df may refer to:

Gaming
 DeFRaG, a modification for the computer game Quake III Arena
 DragonFable, a 2006 video game by Artix Entertainment
 Dwarf Fortress, a 2006 sandbox-style computer game

Places
 Distrito Federal (Brazil), or the Federal District
 Distrito Federal (Mexico), or the Federal District, now known as Mexico City

Politics
 Danish People's Party (Dansk Folkeparti)
 Democratic Front (Bosnia and Herzegovina) (Demokratska fronta)
 Democratic Front (Montenegro) (Demokratski front)

Science and technology
 df (Unix), a Unix command to report disk space usage by a filesystem
 Dairy free, identifying products that contain no milk
 Decapacitation factor, in biochemistry
 Degrees of freedom, various measures in statistics, mathematics and physics
 Density function, a mathematical function with a wide range of applications
 Dielectric loss
 Direction finding, a technique used to locate radio transmitters
 Direction flag, a flag stored in the FLAGS register on all x86-compatible CPUs
 Dissipation factor, a measure of loss-rate of energy of an oscillation mode in a dissipative system
 Dongfeng (missile), a Chinese intercontinental ballistic missile
 Dongfeng series of diesel locomotives
 China Railways DF
 China Railways DF4
 China Railways DF8
 Methylphosphonyl difluoride, a chemical weapons precursor
 Daylight factor (DF), the ratio of the light level inside a structure to the light level outside the structure.

Other uses
 Defender (association football)
 Delta Force, a component of the U.S. Army Joint Special Operations Command
 Design Factory, a department of Aalto University
 Duty Free, goods which are free from tax or duty
 New Zealand DF class locomotive (1979)
 Quantum Air (formerly AeBal), Spanish airline (IATA code DF)
 Disfellowshipping (see Jehovah's Witnesses and congregational discipline)

See also
 Dongfeng (disambiguation)